GMT+03:30 is an identifier for a time offset from UTC of +03:30. This time is used only in Iran, so it is also called Iran Standard Time.

As standard time (year-round)

Asia
 Iran – Iran Standard Time (IRST)

Principal cities: Tehran, Mashhad, Isfahan, Karaj, Shiraz, Tabriz, Qom

References

UTC offsets
Time in Iran